Han Xin (231/230 – early 196 BC) was a Chinese military general and politician who served Liu Bang during the Chu–Han Contention and contributed greatly to the founding of the Han dynasty. Han Xin was named as one of the "Three Heroes of the early Han dynasty", along with Zhang Liang and Xiao He.

Han Xin is best remembered as a brilliant military leader for the strategies and tactics he employed in warfare, some of which became the origins of certain Chinese idioms, he was undefeated in battle and for his accomplishments he was considered the "God of War". In recognition of Han Xin's contributions, Liu Bang conferred the titles of "King of Qi" on him in 203 BC and "King of Chu" in the following year. However, Liu Bang feared Han Xin's growing influence and gradually reduced his authority, demoting him to "Marquis of Huaiyin" in late 202 BC. In early 196 BC, Han Xin was accused of participating in a rebellion and lured into a trap and executed on Empress Lü Zhi's orders.

Early life

Born in Huaiyin (modern-day Jiangsu Province), Han Xin lived a childhood in destitution, as his father died early. He was despised by those around him, as he often relied on others for his meals. He had a keen interest in military strategy and spent his time studying military treatises and practicing sword techniques.

Once when he was suffering from hunger, he met an old woman living off by washing clothes for people who provided him food. On another occasion, a hooligan saw Han Xin carrying a sword and challenged him to either kill him or crawl between his legs. Han Xin knew that he would become a criminal if he killed him, so instead of responding to the taunts, he crawled between the hooligan's legs and was laughed at.

Several years later, after becoming the King of Chu, Han Xin returned to his hometown, found the woman who fed him and rewarded her with 1,000 taels of gold. Han Xin also found the hooligan and instead of taking revenge, he appointed the hooligan as a zhongwei (中尉; equivalent to a present-day lieutenant). He said, "This man is a hero. Do you think I could not have killed him when he humiliated me? I would not become famous even if I killed him then. Hence, I endured the humiliation to preserve my life to achieve great things in the future."

Service under Xiang Yu

In 209 BC, Han Xin joined Xiang Liang's rebel army when rebellions erupted throughout China to overthrow the Qin dynasty. Han Xin continued serving Xiang Yu (Xiang Liang's nephew) after Xiang Liang was killed in action at the Battle of Dingtao. He was not placed in high regard and worked as a sentry and prepared meals. He constantly proposed strategies to Xiang Yu but was ignored. In 206 BC, Han Xin deserted Xiang Yu's army and went to join Liu Bang.

Han Xin was loyal to Liu Bang in many scenarios; his advisor proposed many suggestions to him to be independent from Liu Bang, but he rejected the proposal and raised sword on his neck to stop further acts of persuasion. One envoy was sent by Xiang Yu to convince him to ally with Chu to defeat Liu Bang, but he rejected the proposal, mainly because he was loyal to Liu Bang and wanted to bring peace to the people of China. His vision was far better than Liu Bang's and the rest of the kings during the warring state and Qin empire periods.

Service under Liu Bang during the Chu–Han Contention

Initially, after joining Liu Bang's army, Han Xin was not given any important roles. Once, he violated military law and was due to be punished by execution. When it was his turn to be beheaded, Han Xin saw Xiahou Ying (one of Liu Bang's trusted generals) and said, "I thought the king wanted to rule an empire. Why is he killing valiant men then?" Xiahou Ying was surprised and spared Han Xin's life and recommended him to Liu Bang. Liu Bang was not impressed with Han Xin and put him in charge of food supplies. During that time, Han Xin met Xiao He (one of Liu Bang's chief advisors), who recognised his talent.

In 206 BC, Liu Bang was granted the title of "King of Han" by Xiang Yu after the latter divided the former Qin Empire into the Eighteen Kingdoms, and was relocated to the remote Bashu region (in present-day Sichuan). Some of Liu Bang's men became discontented after spending months in Bashu (in present-day Sichuan) and deserted. Meanwhile, Han Xin was expecting Xiao He to recommend him to Liu Bang, but he had not received news for a long time so he became disappointed and left as well. When Xiao He heard that Han Xin had left, he immediately rushed to find Han and bring him back, and did not manage to inform Liu Bang in time. Xiao He eventually caught up with Han Xin and managed to persuade Han to go back with him. This event gave rise to the saying, "Xiao He chases Han Xin under the moonlight". In the meantime, Liu Bang had a nervous breakdown after hearing a rumour that Xiao He had also deserted him. While he was relieved when he saw Xiao He returning with Han Xin, he angrily asked Xiao, "Of all those who deserted, why did you only choose to go after Han Xin?"  Xiao He then strongly recommended Han Xin to Liu Bang, saying that Han's talent was unmatched. Liu Bang accepted Xiao He's suggestion and held a special ceremony to appoint Han Xin as a general.

Conquering the Three Qins

After his appointment, Han Xin analysed the situation for Liu Bang and devised a plan for Liu to conquer Xiang Yu's Western Chu kingdom. In late 206 BC, Liu Bang's forces left Hanzhong and prepared to attack the Three Qins in Guanzhong. Han Xin ordered some soldiers to pretend to repair the gallery roads linking Guanzhong and Hanzhong, while sending another army to secretly pass through Chencang and make a surprise attack on Zhang Han. Zhang Han was caught off guard and the Han forces emerged victorious, proceeding to take over Sima Xin and Dong Yi's kingdoms. The strategy employed by Han Xin, known as mingxiu zhandao, andu Chencang (明修棧道, 暗度陳倉; lit. "appearing to repair the gallery roads while making secret advances through Chencang"), became one of the Thirty-Six Stratagems.

Battle of Jingsuo

After the conquest of the Three Qins, Liu Bang allowed Han Xin to lead an army to attack Zhang Han's remnant forces in Feiqiu, while he personally led an army to attack Chu's capital of Pengcheng (present-day Xuzhou, Jiangsu), capturing it in 205 BC. Xiang Yu turned back from his campaign in the Qi kingdom to retake Pengcheng and defeated Liu Bang by surprise in the Battle of Pengcheng. Liu Bang retreated to Xingyang after his defeat. Xiao He was placed in charge of Guanzhong and he sent Han to lead reinforcements to help Liu Bang. Han Xin defeated Chu forces in the Battle of Jingsuo and drove them east of Xingyang.

Northern campaign

In late 205 BC, Liu Bang put Han Xin in command of an army and sent him to conquer the rival kingdoms in northern China. Han Xin's first target was Western Wei, ruled by Wei Bao, who defected to Xiang Yu's side after initially surrendering to Liu Bang. Han Xin tricked Wei forces into cornering themselves at the border and made a surprise attack on Anyi (present-day Xia County, Shanxi) with another force, scoring victory and capturing Wei Bao in battle. Shortly later, Han Xin proceeded to conquer the Dai kingdom and captured Dai's chancellor, Xia Shuo.

Han Xin's army advanced further to attack the Zhao kingdom. He scored another tactical victory against the 200,000 strong Zhao army with a smaller force in the Battle of Jingxing. After his victory, Han Xin sent a messenger to Zang Tu (King of Yan) asking for his surrender, and Zang Tu agreed to submit to Liu Bang.

In late 204 BC, Liu Bang ordered Han Xin to lead an army to attack the Qi kingdom. However, Liu Bang later sent Li Yiji to persuade Tian Guang (King of Qi) to surrender, without informing Han Xin. Upon hearing this, Kuai Che ("Tong" was the name given to him by Han historians (primarily Sima Qian in the Records of the Grand Historian and Ban Gu in the Book of Han) after Emperor Wu of Han ascended the throne, as Emperor's Wu's personal name is also "Che") advised Han Xin to proceed with the invasion because if Li Yiji succeeded in persuading Qi to surrender, his contributions would outshine Han Xin's. Hence, Han Xin ordered an assault on Lixia and went on to capture Qi's capital of Linzi. Tian Guang already had the intention of surrendering but the attacks angered him and he felt betrayed by Li Yiji and had Li executed. In the meantime, Xiang Yu sent Long Ju to lead an army to reinforce Tian Guang. Han Xin achieved another decisive victory against the combined forces of Qi and Chu at the Battle of Wei River. Han Xin later sent a messenger to Liu Bang, requesting that Liu appoint him as the acting King of Qi. At that time, Liu Bang was trapped in Xingyang by Xiang Yu and Han Xin's request angered him, because he was expecting Han to come to his aid. However, Zhang Liang and Chen Ping cautioned Liu Bang against rejecting the request, because Han Xin may become discontented and would rebel, putting them in a dangerous situation. Liu Bang reluctantly agreed to Han Xin's request.

Meanwhile, Xiang Yu sent Wu She to persuade Han Xin to declare independence from Liu Bang and form an alliance with him, in hope of losing an opponent on the northern front. Kuai Che also strongly urged Han Xin to rebel against Liu Bang, warning him that Liu was starting to distrust him because he wielded too much power. However, Han Xin refused to renounce his loyalty to Liu Bang.

Battle of Gaixia

In 203 BC, Liu Bang came to an armistice with Xiang Yu, known as the Treaty of Hong Canal, which divided China into west and east under their respective domains. Shortly after, Liu Bang renounced the treaty and led an attack on Xiang Yu's forces, which were retreating east. Liu Bang sent messengers to request assistance from Han Xin and Peng Yue in forming a three-pronged attack on Western Chu, but Han Xin and Peng Yue did not mobilise their troops, and Liu Bang was defeated by Xiang Yu in the Battle of Guling.

Liu Bang retreated back to his territory and strengthened his defences, while sending messengers to Han Xin and Peng Yue again, promising to grant them land and titles if they helped him defeat Xiang Yu. Han Xin and Peng Yue brought their armies to meet Liu Bang in late 203 BC, and Han suggested using a strategy of "ambush on ten sides" to weaken Xiang Yu's forces before making a final assault. The plan succeeded, and by 202 BC Xiang Yu was trapped in Gaixia and surrounded by Han forces on all sides. He attempted to break out of the encirclement and eventually arrived at the bank of the Wu River, where he made a last stand before committing suicide.

After Xiang Yu's death, China was unified under Liu Bang's rule, and Liu granted Han Xin the title of "King of Chu" in recognition of his contributions. Months later, Liu Bang was proclaimed "Emperor" and became known as "Emperor Gaozu of Han".

Service during the Western Han dynasty

Demotion
When Xiang Yu died in 202 BC, Zhongli Mo (one of Xiang Yu's generals) came to Han Xin and requested refuge. On account of their past friendship, Han Xin protected Zhongli Mo and let him stay with him. When Emperor Gaozu heard that Zhongli Mo was hiding in Han Xin's territory, he ordered Han to arrest Zhongli Mo, but Han Xin refused.

A year later, Gaozu heard rumours that Han Xin was plotting a rebellion. By this time, Zhang Liang had already retreated from political affairs, so Chen Ping was Gaozu's most trusted advisor. After discussion, they came to the conclusion that Gaozu could not best Han Xin in battle, so it would be most ideal to strike Han Xin when he was unprepared. Chen Ping proposed to lure Han Xin into meeting, on a pretext of Liu Bang touring the Yunmeng Marshes (present-day Jianghan Plains, Hubei Province). He sent this message out to all warlords across the land. When Han Xin heard that Gaozu was heading towards the land of Chu, his first instinct was to rebel, but he decided he had committed no crime and stayed put. At this time, someone told Han Xin that if he were to present Zhongli Mo's head to Gaozu, than he would be happy and spare him. Han Xin then met Zhongli Mo to decide their next course of action, and brought up this idea. Zhongli Mo then promptly slit his own throat, but not before claiming Han Xin would follow soon after. Han Xin brought Zhongli Mo's severed head to Gaozu and explained his innocence, but Gaozu ordered Han to be arrested. Han Xin exclaimed, "It is true when people say: The hunting dog becomes food as well after it is used to hunt game; a good bow is discarded when there are no birds left for shooting; an advisor dies after he helps his lord conquer a rival kingdom. Now that the empire is in place, I no longer serve any purpose!" Liu Bang's only response was: "Someone claimed you had rebelled", and proceeded to cuff Han Xin and bring him back to Luoyang. Although Gaozu pardoned Han Xin and released him later, he still demoted Han from "King of Chu" to "Marquis of Huaiyin".

Downfall and Dispute over death

After his demotion, Han Xin knew that Gaozu was beginning to distrust him and had become wary of his talent. Hence, Han Xin claimed to be ill and stayed at home most of the time to reduce Gaozu's suspicions. Around 197 BC, Chen Xi (Marquis of Yangxia) met Han Xin before leaving for Julu, where Han Xin promptly pulled him aside, dismissing all nearby servants. He promised to aid Chen Xi from inside the capital if Chen Xi were to start an uprising against the Han Dynasty. Not long after, Chen Xi rebelled and Gaozu personally led an army to suppress the rebellion, while Han Xin claimed sickness and stayed behind.

While Gaozu was away, one of Han Xin's household servants offended him, so Han Xin locked him up as punishment. The servant's young brother gave news of Han Xin's desire to rebel to Empress Lü Zhi, who then plotted with Xiao He to lure Han Xin into a trap. They pretended Gaozu had returned from suppressing the rebellion and that there would be a feast to commemorate the success. Xiao He managed to persuade Han Xin into coming to Changle Palace, where the Empress lived, and he was bound and executed as soon as he stepped through the doors. Han Xin's clan was exterminated on the Empress's orders as well. Upon return from his campaign, Gaozu expressed both relief and regret when he learnt of Han Xin's death. He asked the Empress for Han Xin's last words, which were, "I regret not listening to Kuai Che's advice, and now I have been deceived by such vile people. This is the heaven's will!"

In another section of Sima Qian's Records of the Grand Historian, The Hereditary House of Chancellor Xiao, the events of the Chu-Han Contention are told from Xiao He's point of view, and puts a different narrative on the death of Han Xin. In this autobiography, Liu Bang was immediately notified of Han Xin's rebellion and execution, rather than waiting until after his return. 

Throughout history, historians and scholars alike have debated over the plausibility of Han Xin's rebellion. Although the Records of the Grand Historian have it written in black and white, many believe that Han Xin was loyal until his death. They believe that Lü Zhi and Xiao He framed Han Xin of treason, under the knowledge of Liu Bang, because Han Xin's reputation amongst the military was too high, and combined with his talents, became a threat to the throne. Although historians have always looked to Sima Qian's records for facts, some believe it is possible that as a citizen of the Han Dynasty, he could not go against the government acknowledged version of events. A Tang Dynasty poet, Xu Hun, once wrote a poem titled "The Shrine of Han Xin", in which it states that it is unlikely for Han Xin to stay loyal when he held military power, yet rebel when he had not a single soldier.

Legend

In legend, Gaozu once promised Han Xin that if he "faced Heaven and stood firm on Earth" (頂天立地於漢土; i.e. remained loyal) to the Han Dynasty, he would not have Han Xin killed by any weapon used by soldiers. Hence, when Han Xin was executed, he was hung in midair within a great bell and was pierced to death with swords made from wood or bamboo. As such, when he died, Han Xin was neither "facing Heaven" (because his body was covered by the bell) nor "standing firm on Earth" (because he was suspended inside the bell), and was not killed by any weapon used by soldiers (soldiers do not use wooden or bamboo swords).

Legacy

Some Chinese idioms and sayings originating from the events in Han Xin's life are listed as follows:

 Shame of crawling through between someone's legs: Used to describe a humiliating incident. This idiom originated from the incident when Han Xin was bullied by a hooligan. 
 When Han Xin selects his troops, the more the better: Originated from a conversation between Han Xin and Liu Bang. Liu asked Han, "How many men do you think I can command?", to which Han Xin replied, "A maximum of 100,000." Liu Bang asked, "What about you?", and Han Xin replied, "The more the better." Liu Bang said, "So that means I cannot defeat you?" Han Xin explained, "No, my lord, you command generals while I command soldiers."
 Both success and failure are due to Xiao He, life and death are due to two women: Xiao He helped Han Xin become a general, which enabled Han to put his talent to good use. However, Han Xin's downfall was also due to Xiao He. In his early days, Han Xin was given "life" by the old woman, who provided him with food. His death was due to Empress Lü Zhi.

While Han Xin was under house arrest, he did a mass organization of military books together with Zhang Liang. They put together one hundred and eighty-two books, removed certain parts and chose the reliable bits, and came out with thirty-five books. Han Xin himself also wrote three essays regarding military strategy.

His descendants are said to have fled to the area of modern Guangdong and Guangxi and changed their name to Wéi (韋).

Evaluation
At the end of Han Xin's biography in Shiji, Sima Qian commented on Han as follows:

In volume 12 of Zizhi Tongjian, after the entry on Han Xin's death, Sima Guang commented on Han as follows:

References

Bibliography
Sima Qian. Records of the Grand Historian, Volume 92.
Ban Gu et al. Book of Han, Volume 34.
Sima Guang. Zizhi Tongjian, Volume 12.

External links 

196 BC deaths
2nd-century BC executions
Chinese princes
Chu–Han contention people
Deified Chinese people
Emperor Gaozu of Han
Executed Han dynasty people
Executed people from Jiangsu
Han dynasty generals from Jiangsu
Han dynasty politicians from Jiangsu
People executed by the Han dynasty by decapitation
People from Huai'an